Jhalawar Road railway station is a small railway station in Jhalawar district, Rajasthan. Its code is JHW. It serves Jhalawar city. The station consists of three platforms. The platforms are not well sheltered. It lacks many facilities including water and sanitation. The station is 38 km from Jhalawar city before construction of line to Jhalawar city this station was main rail route.

Major trains 
 Kota Vadodara Passenger (unreserved)
 Bandra Terminus Gorakhpur Avadh Express
 Bandra Terminus Muzaffarpur Avadh Express 
 Bandra Terminus- Dehradun Express
 Firozpur Janata Express
 Mathura Ratlam Passenger (unreserved)
 Phulera Ratlam Fast Passenger
 Ratlam- Kota Passenger (unreserved)

References

Railway stations in Jhalawar district
Kota railway division
Jhalawar